The following lists events that happened during 1997 in Chile.

Incumbents
President of Chile: Eduardo Frei Ruiz-Tagle

Events 
 Avant Airlines was founded.

October
15 October – 1997 Punitaqui earthquake

December
11 December – Chilean parliamentary election, 1997

Deaths
6 April – Rosita Serrano (b. 1912)
13 April – Rodolfo Oroz (b. 1895)
10 August – Malú Gatica (b. 1922)
25 August – Clodomiro Almeyda (b. 1923)

References 

 
Years of the 20th century in Chile
Chile